Redshirts (originally titled Redshirts: A Novel with Three Codas) is a space adventure by science fiction writer John Scalzi that capitalizes on tropes from Star Trek and similar television series. The book was published by Tor Books in June 2012. The audiobook of the novel is narrated by Wil Wheaton. The book won the 2013 Hugo Award for Best Novel and Locus Award for Best Science Fiction Novel.

Plot summary
In the prologue, several senior officers of the Intrepid, flagship of the Universal Union, lament the unusually high number of casualties of low-ranking crew members during recent away missions and conclude that they will need more crewmen to replace them.

The Intrepid takes on five new ensigns including Andrew Dahl, an expert in alien religions and xenobiology. Dahl quickly discerns that the crew is extremely phobic of being near the senior officers and of going on away missions due to their high fatality rate. Over the course of several missions, various crew members suggest that the deaths are due to incompetence, superstition, or cosmic forces, requiring "sacrifices" of some crew members so that others will survive.

After several close calls, Dahl meets Jenkins, a crew member who offers a different theory: their reality and timeline are under periodic influence of a badly written television show from the past. As the writers create the plot, characters' free will temporarily ceases in order to progress "the Narrative" of the show. This is why otherwise good officers are occasionally incompetent, Ensigns make poor decisions, and the ship has mysterious technology on board to produce last-minute inventions and medicines which would otherwise be impossible to produce: the narrative is subject to the skill of the writers, who are not military or scientific experts and need to artificially maintain a high sense of drama with on-screen deaths. Jenkins explains that Dahl and the other Ensigns' routine duties and colorful histories will inevitably make them targets of "the narrative" when the writers need "glorified extras" to kill for emotional impact.

The Ensigns kidnap a senior officer and proceed to travel to the past with the mission of convincing them to stop the show. Once there, they meet their actor doubles and realize that they are exact doppelgängers; even their imagined backstories became integral events of the Ensigns' lives. Dahl strikes a deal with the show's producer and head writer, who is Jenkins's double, to save the life of the producer’s comatose son by switching him with his crew member double. Because the producer's son appeared on the show as an extra, one of the crew members is effectively his identical twin, and will revert to the young man's personality by staying in the past. Conversely, Dahl reasons that bringing the comatose son into the future will allow them to use "the Narrative" to their advantage, letting the advanced technology and reality-altering properties of the writing revive him.

Dahl and the Ensigns return to the future and live out the new revised plot created by the head writer, which includes saving the "injured crewman" they had on board. While rescuing the ship, Dahl sacrifices himself to save a senior officer for the sake of the narrative. Awakening later, Dahl receives a message from the writers and producers explaining his recovery, and they promise to make the lives of the crew meaningful instead of using death as a quick plot device. Dahl then compares the close calls he has had with those of the TV show's protagonists, and deduces that there is another narrative protecting him, which makes him wonder if he is actually a protagonist in another story.

The novel features three epilogues. In the first one the head writer deals with writer's block as a consequence of his bad writing choices. In the second one the producer's son, having reverted to his personality from the crewman who switched with him, determines to do something useful with the second chance at life he's been given. In the third one an actress, who once played an extra on the show, receives a message showing intimate details of the woman whose life—and death—she helped create. She memorializes her lost "sister" on a beach and meets the head writer of the show, with both realizing that their characters on the show were married.

Characters 
New Recruits on the Intrepid:
 Ensign Andrew Dahl, the hero of the novel.
 Ensign Maia Duvall, Kerensky's love interest.
 Ensign Jimmy Hanson, Dahl's best friend. His father is stated to be one of the richest men in the galaxy.
 Ensign Jasper Hester. He's the only character without a detailed backstory because he was only created to allow the son of the show's producer to appear in the show. He trades places with the comatose son to save his life.
 Ensign Finn, a somewhat reformed criminal and the only main character of the novel to die, protecting Abernathy from an assassination attempt.

Senior officers of Intrepid and protagonists of the TV show:
 Captain Lucius Abernathy. The ship's captain, who is reasonable whenever his actions aren't being controlled by the show's plot, but makes terrible decisions whenever they are.
 Science Officer Q'eeng. The ending hints that he has some suspicions about the nature of the world he lives in.
 Chief Engineer Paul West. Field missions including him are stated to be the most lethal to supporting characters.
 (Astrogator) Anatoly Kerensky . Receives life-threatening injuries in nearly every mission, but heals with great speed in order to be ready for the next mission.
 Medical Officer Hartnell

Other crew in the Intrepid:
 Officer Jenkins. Suffers a breakdown when his wife dies to advance the show's plot. He hides in the cargo tunnels and monitors all activity on the ship. He develops the theory that the Intrepids events are influenced by the TV show, and devises the means to travel to the past to stop it.
 Lieutenant Collins, Dahl's direct officer at the exobiology laboratory.
 Dahl's lab mates Ben Trin, Jake Cassaway and Fiona Mbeke. They use Jenkin's alerts to avoid being assigned to field missions with the senior officers, but a failure of this system leads to Cassaway and Mbeke dying in a field mission with Q'eeng.
 Ensign Davis, shown in the prologue as devoured by land worms to generate a plot point for the TV show.
 Lieutenant Fischer. An inexperienced officer who fights alongside the main characters during a field mission but is consumed by nanobots when he boards an evacuation shuttle with none of the main characters aboard.
 Ensign Grover. A veteran crewmember who is about to retire and get married before he gets dragged into a field mission and killed.

TV show cast and crew:
 Charles Paulson, head producer of the show.
 Matt Paulson, Charles' son and the actor playing Hester, in coma due to a motorcycle accident.
 Nick Weinstein, chief writer of the show and the actor who played Jenkins.
 Mark Corey, the actor who plays Kerensky.
 Brian Abnett, the actor who plays Dahl.
 Samantha Martinez, the actress that played Jenkins' wife.

Themes
The novel satirises the tropes of redshirt and black box in television science fiction writing.  In the course of the satire, Scalzi examines free will and what it takes to make one the hero of one's own story.

Reception
The novel won the RT Reviewer's Choice Award for 2012, the 2013 Hugo Award for Best Novel, and Locus Award for Best Science Fiction Novel, and the Geffen Award for Best Translated Science Fiction Novel.

John Schwartz of the New York Times noted that the plight of the Ensigns as they realize their situation as characters in a television drama was similar to Rosencrantz and Guildenstern Are Dead, where the story tells what happens when its characters  find out they are not in the "real" storyline. Forbes magazine praised the novel saying "You don't have to be a hardcore sci-fi fan to enjoy Redshirts, though there are plenty of Easter Eggs for those who are. And the beauty of the book is that it works on multiple levels. If you're looking for a breezy, fun read for the beach, this is your book. If you want to go down a level and read it as a surreal meditation on character and genre like Rosencrantz and Guildenstern Are Dead, this is your book."

FX started developing a limited television series of the novel in 2014. However, nothing materialized and the production window closed in 2017 when the rights reverted to Scalzi.

References

External links
 Redshirts at Google Books

Comic science fiction novels
2012 science fiction novels
Parodies of Star Trek
Space opera novels
Novels about time travel
Metafictional novels
Novels by John Scalzi
Hugo Award for Best Novel-winning works
Tor Books books
2012 American novels